Florida's 24th congressional district is an electoral district for the U.S. Congress, located in southeast Florida. It was redrawn after the 2020 U.S. census. This district includes parts of Miami north of Florida State Road 112, including Little Haiti, as well as Brownsville, Biscayne Park, North Miami, Miami Gardens, and Opa Locka, along with the southern Broward County communities of Pembroke Park, West Park, and parts of Miramar. In the 2020 redistricting cycle, the district was drawn to include parts of barrier islands northeast of Miami, including Miami Beach and Surfside, while all of Hollywood became part of the new 25th district as Country Club and some of Miami, including Allapattah and Wynwood, became part of the new 26th district.

From 2003 to 2012, the 24th district had been created after the 2000 U.S. census and included portions of Brevard County (including Titusville) and parts of Orange, Seminole, and Volusia counties. The district encompassed Port Orange, Winter Park, Edgewater, and New Smyrna Beach. Most of that district is now the 7th District, while the current 24th covers most of what had been the 17th District from 1993 to 2013.

The district is represented by Democrat Frederica Wilson. With a Cook Partisan Voting Index rating of D+25, it is one of the most Democratic districts in Florida.

Voter Registration
As of October 2020: 
Democrats: 267,980 (61.62%)
Independents: 110,078 (25.31%)
Republicans: 52,492 (12.07%) 
Others: 4,317 (0.99%)

Statewide election results

List of representatives

Election results

2002

2004

2006

2008

2010

2012

2014

2016

2018

2020

2022

Notes

References
 Congressional Biographical Directory of the United States 1774–present

External links
Rep. Frederica Wilson official House of Representatives site

24
Constituencies established in 2003
2003 establishments in Florida